The Real Housewives of Cheshire (abbreviated RHOCheshire) is a British reality television series that premiered on ITVBe on 12 January 2015. Developed as the first British installment in The Real Housewives franchise, it has aired fifteen seasons and focuses on the personal and professional lives of several women living in or around Cheshire, England.

The current cast consists of Lauren Simon, Seema Malhotra, Rachel Lugo, Hanna Kinsella, Nicole Sealey, Lystra Adams, Sheena Lynch and Natasha Hamilton.

Overview and casting

Series 1–4 
On 22 September 2014, ITV announced the cast for Britain's first Real Housewives installment The Real Housewives of Cheshire. Starring Ampika Pickston, Dawn Ward, Lauren Simon, Leanne Brown, Magali Gorré and Tanya Bardsley, the series follows the cast's intertwining and fast lives in the rich communities of Cheshire and Greater Manchester. ITV had planned to profile the glamorous denizens of London's Knightsbridge in the series, but ITV bosses said "their homes weren’t quite big enough..", and so Cheshire was chosen. After the success of the first series, with the premiere becoming ITVBe's second highest rated programme ever behind The Only Way is Essex, on 27 April 2015, it was announced that a second series had been commissioned, with filming to begin in May 2015. The second series aired from 7 September 2015 to 9 November 2015, with the cast from the first series all returning.

On 1 March 2016, it was announced that Gorré would be departing the series, although a return in future wasn’t ruled out. Three days later, the network announced that Ward, Simon, Pickston, Brown and Bardsley would all be returning for a third series along with three new wives, Missé Beqiri, Seema Malhotra and Stacey Forsey. The third series premiered on 4 April 2016. Three weeks later, Bardsley confirmed that the third series would have a reunion show, a first since the show's inception. On 19 May 2016, it was announced that Irish television presenter, Brian Dowling, would be hosting the reunion show. The reunion was filmed at Peckforton Castle in Cheshire in late May and aired on 13 June 2016, concluding the third series.

On 8 June 2016, a week before the airing of the reunion for the third series, it was announced that the show would be returning for a fourth series. It was also revealed that all the housewives from the third series would be returning. Filming for the fourth series commenced on 1 July 2016 and the following month, a small teaser was broadcast on ITVBe that revealed the fourth series would premiere on 5 September 2016. The fourth series' reunion was filmed at the same location as the third series’ reunion, at Peckforton Castle in Cheshire. The reunion aired on 8 November 2016.

Series 5–8 
On 3 January 2017, it was announced that the show had been renewed for both a fifth and sixth series, with both set to air in 2017. Filming for the fifth series began in late January. On 13 February 2017, it was revealed that the fifth series would premiere on 27 March 2017. It was also announced that Beqiri would not be returning in a main housewife role, in order to allow her to take a step back and focus on her relationship but would appear in a smaller capacity. Former housewife, Gorré commented on the upcoming series, stating "I have heard there is a new cast member and she is more Geordie Shore than Golden Triangle." On 21 March 2017, Ester Dohnalová was announced to be the new housewife for the fifth series. Subsequently, on 28 April 2017, Beqiri announced the fifth series would be her last. The fifth series didn’t have a reunion show and instead featured host, Dowling, visiting the housewives' homes in a special titled 'At Home with the Real Housewives of Cheshire'.

On 9 July 2017, Simon exclusively revealed that filming for the sixth series had begun. Later that month, original housewife, Pickston, announced her departure from the series after six seasons. It was exclusively announced on an ITVBe advert that two new housewives would be joining the show, alongside the returning seven housewives. The sixth series premiered on 11 September 2017, with Rachel Lugo and Nermina Pieters-Mekic joining the cast. Lugo's identical twin sister, Katie Kane appeared in a recurring capacity, whilst the cast filmed in Gibraltar.

On 10 February 2018, Brown confirmed her exit from the show, ahead of the seventh season, due to her ongoing legal battle with former friend and co-star, Ward. She stated her intention to never appear on the show again, something she later retracted and ended up going back on, as she appeared in fourteenth season of the show, in a guest appearance. Brown’s departure marked the third of six housewives to leave the show from the original line-up, leaving Bardsley, Simon and Ward remaining. The first clip for the seventh series was revealed on ITV stating that the show will be back in March, confirming the return of the remaining housewives as well as a guest appearance from Kane. On 28 February 2018, it was revealed that Christine McGuinness, the wife of Paddy McGuinness would be joining the show for the seventh series. Upon the series premiere, it was announced that her appearance would be in a recurring capacity. The seventh series concluded with a reunion show which took place at Manchester Hall, the first to be filmed in a new location in the show's history.

At the end of the seventh seasons’ reunion, host Dowling confirmed that the show would return for an eighth series. On 27 July 2018, it was revealed that both Forsey and Pieters-Mekic would not be returning as main housewives for the eighth season but would feature as guests.
 On 1 August 2018, the cast of the eighth series was revealed, introducing new housewives Hanna Kinsella and Perla Navia.

Series 9–12 
On 19 March 2019, a ninth series was confirmed to be premiering the following week, with all the housewives returning from the previous series, with the exception of original housewife, Simon, citing her intention to focus on her two girls amid her ongoing divorce, from husband, Paul Simon. On 2 August 2019, the cast of the tenth series was confirmed, with all housewives returning from the previous series, with the addition of Leilani Dowding while McGuiness and Pieters-Mekic would return as guests. The tenth series also moved from the regular ten o’clock timeslot, to the peak time position of nine o’clock. There was a special episode to mark a milestone one hundredth episode, which included all current housewives as well as features from former housewives Brown, Gorré, Simon, and Forsey.

On 13 January 2020, Dowding confirmed she would not be returning to the series after one season on Instagram.
On 26 January 2020, it was announced that Simon would be returning to the series, following a two-season break. On 4 March 2020, it was announced that the eleventh series would premiere in March, with Navia announcing her departure from the series after three seasons. The eleventh series was postponed due to the COVID-19 pandemic but on 7 April 2020, it was announced that the upcoming series would premiere on 20 April 2020 with Nicole Sealey joining the cast but that the series would feature only eight episodes, rather than the traditional eleven. A virtual reunion was held to review the season. In August 2020, Dohnalová announced her departure from the series after filming the first two episodes of the twelfth season. That same month, longtime friend of the housewives Christine McGuinness also announced that she had quit the series. On 30 September 2020, it was announced that twelfth season would begin airing on the 12 October with new housewife, Lystra Adams, joining the group, during the third episode of the series.

On 11 December 2020, original housewife, Ward, announced her departure from the series and confirming the series will continue with another season. She cited that she wished to spend more time with her family and said that the pandemic had offered her time to reflect on this decision.

Series 13–present 
Filming for thirteenth season commenced on 1 March 2021. On 28 April 2021, it was announced that all of the wives from the twelfth season, with the exception of Ward, would be returning, alongside new housewife and psychic, Deborah Davies. Dohnalova was announced to make guest appearances during this season. Season 13 premiered on 10 May 2021. Filming for the fourteenth instalment commenced on 4 August 2021. Two weeks later, it was announced that original cast member, Brown, would be returning as a friend of for the first time since leaving the show following the sixth season. On 27 September 2021, it was confirmed that all the housewives would be returning for the fourteenth season, along with the addition of Sheena Lynch and the series premiered on 11 October 2021.

On 11 November 2021, following little appearance on the fourteenth season, Bardsley announced she had quit the show after almost seven years. In January 2022, Davies announced on her Instagram, that she was to leave the show to pursue upcoming projects. The fifteenth season premiered in August 2022, on a delayed schedule, in comparison to previous years. Katie Alex was introduced as a series regular with Karen Loderick and Ashley Stobart joining as “friends of the housewives”. Pieters-Mekic and Kane made guest appearances throughout the season. During the reunion special, the sixteenth season was confirmed to have been ordered. It is set to premiere on 20 March, 2023.

Timeline of housewives

Note:

Episodes

International broadcast
In Australia, the series premiered on Arena on 24 May 2015. In the United States, the series debuted on 14 November 2015, on Bravo, the same network that initiated The Real Housewives franchise. In Spain the series airs on Ten.

References

External links

 
 The Real Housewives of Cheshire at TV Guide

 
2010s British reality television series
2020s British reality television series
2015 British television series debuts
Television shows set in Cheshire
ITV reality television shows
Television shows set in Greater Manchester
English-language television shows
British television series based on American television series
Women in the United Kingdom